Events from the year 1988 in Croatia.

Incumbents

Events

Arts and literature

Sport
Jugoplastika Split became champion of Yugoslavia in basketball.
Damir Škaro won a bronze medal in light heavyweight boxing at the 1988 Olympics.

Births
January 5 - Nikola Kalinić, footballer
May 19 - Antonija Mišura, basketball player
June 1 - Domagoj Duvnjak, handball player
November 9 - Josip Čorić, Croatian-Bosnian footballer

Deaths
January 9 - Juraj Krnjević, leader of the Croatian Peasant Party in exile
February 6 - Zvonimir Rogoz, actor
August 2 - Nada Klaić, historian
September 26 - Branko Zebec, footballer

References

 
Years of the 20th century in Croatia
Croatia